Holzsußra is a municipality in the district Kyffhäuserkreis, in Thuringia, Germany. It is around 40 km northwest of Erfurt and 115 km west of Leipzig.

References

Municipalities in Thuringia
Kyffhäuserkreis
Schwarzburg-Sondershausen